The 54th New York State Legislature, consisting of the New York State Senate and the New York State Assembly, met from January 4 to April 26, 1831, during the third year of Enos T. Throop's governorship, in Albany.

Background
Under the provisions of the New York Constitution of 1821, 32 senators were elected on general tickets in eight senatorial districts for four-year terms. They were divided into four classes, and every year eight Senate seats came up for election. Assemblymen were elected countywide on general tickets to a one-year term, the whole Assembly being renewed annually.

State Senator Moses Hayden died on February 13, 1830, leaving a vacancy in the Eighth District.

At this time, there were three political parties: the Jacksonians (supporting President Andrew Jackson; led by U.S. Secretary of State Martin Van Buren), the Anti-Masons, and the National Republicans (supporting Henry Clay for the presidency).

The Anti-Masonic state convention met in August 1830 at Utica, and nominated Assemblyman Francis Granger for governor, and Samuel Stevens, of New York City, for lieutenant governor. The National Republicans did not call a convention, and supported the Anti-Masonic ticket.

The Jacksonian state convention met on September 8, 1830, at Herkimer and nominated Gov. Throop for re-election, and Edward P. Livingston for lieutenant governor.

Elections
The State election was held from November 1 to 3, 1830. Gov. Enos T. Throop was re-elected, and Edward P. Livingston was elected lieutenant governor.

State Senator Jonathan S. Conklin (1st D.) was re-elected. David M. Westcott (2nd D.), William I. Dodge (4th D.), Henry A. Foster (5th D.), Charles W. Lynde (6th D.), William H. Seward (7th D.), Trumbull Cary (8th D.); and Assemblymen Herman I. Quackenboss (3rd D.) and Philo C. Fuller (8th D.) were also elected to the Senate. Lynde, Seward, Cary and Fuller were Anti-Masons, the other five were Jacksonians.

Sessions
The Legislature met for the regular session at the Old State Capitol in Albany on January 4, 1831; and adjourned on April 26.

George R. Davis (J) was elected Speaker with 91 votes against 30 for John C. Spencer (A-M).

On January 6, Cary and Fuller drew lots to decide which one of the two senators elected in the 8th District would serve the short term, and which one the full term. Fuller drew the short term, and Cary the full term.

On February 1, the Legislature elected Supreme Court Justice William L. Marcy (J) to succeed Nathan Sanford as U.S. Senator for a six-year term beginning on March 4, 1831.

On February 1, the Legislature re-elected State Treasurer Abraham Keyser, Jr.

On June 3, a National Republican state convention met at Albany, Peter R. Livingston was Chairman. The convention chose delegates to the National Republican national convention which would nominate Henry Clay for U.S. president, among them Stephen Van Rensselaer and Ambrose Spencer.

State Senate

Districts
 The First District (4 seats) consisted of Kings, New York, Queens, Richmond and Suffolk counties.
 The Second District (4 seats) consisted of Delaware, Dutchess, Orange, Putnam, Rockland, Sullivan, Ulster and Westchester counties.
 The Third District (4 seats) consisted of Albany, Columbia, Greene, Rensselaer, Schenectady and Schoharie counties.
 The Fourth District (4 seats) consisted of Clinton, Essex, Franklin, Hamilton, Montgomery, St. Lawrence, Saratoga, Warren and Washington counties.
 The Fifth District (4 seats) consisted of Herkimer, Jefferson, Lewis, Madison, Oneida and Oswego counties.
 The Sixth District (4 seats) consisted of Broome, Chenango, Cortland, Otsego, Steuben, Tioga and Tompkins counties.
 The Seventh District (4 seats) consisted of Cayuga, Onondaga, Ontario, Seneca, Wayne and Yates counties.
 The Eighth District (4 seats) consisted of Allegany, Cattaraugus, Chautauqua, Erie, Genesee, Livingston, Monroe, Niagara and Orleans counties.

Note: There are now 62 counties in the State of New York. The counties which are not mentioned in this list had not yet been established, or sufficiently organized, the area being included in one or more of the abovementioned counties.

Members
The asterisk (*) denotes members of the previous Legislature who continued in office as members of this Legislature. Herman I. Quackenboss and Philo C. Fuller changed from the Assembly to the Senate.

Employees
 Clerk: John F. Bacon

State Assembly

Districts

 Albany County (3 seats)
 Allegany County (1 seat)
 Broome County (1 seat)
 Cattaraugus County (1 seat)
 Cayuga County (4 seats)
 Chautauqua County (2 seats)
 Chenango County (3 seats)
 Clinton County (1 seat)
 Columbia County (3 seats)
 Cortland County (2 seats)
 Delaware County (2 seats)
 Dutchess County (4 seats)
 Erie County (2 seats)
 Essex County (1 seat)
 Franklin County (1 seat)
 Genesee County (3 seats)
 Greene County (2 seats)
 Hamilton and Montgomery counties (3 seats)
 Herkimer County (3 seats)
 Jefferson County (3 seats)
 Kings County (1 seat)
 Lewis County (1 seat)
 Livingston County (2 seats)
 Madison County (3 seats)
 Monroe County (3 seats)
 The City and County of New York (11 seats)
 Niagara County (1 seat)
 Oneida County (5 seats)
 Onondaga County (4 seats)
 Ontario County (3 seats)
 Orange County (3 seats)
 Orleans County (1 seat)
 Oswego County (1 seat)
 Otsego County (4 seats)
 Putnam County (1 seat)
 Queens County (1 seat)
 Rensselaer County (4 seats)
 Richmond County (1 seat)
 Rockland County (1 seat)
 St. Lawrence County (2 seats)
 Saratoga County (3 seats)
 Schenectady County (1 seat)
 Schoharie County (2 seats)
 Seneca County (2 seats)
 Steuben County (2 seats)
 Suffolk County (2 seats)
 Sullivan County (1 seat)
 Tioga County (2 seats)
 Tompkins County (3 seats)
 Ulster County (2 seats)
 Warren County (1 seat)
 Washington (3 seats)
 Wayne County (2 seats)
 Westchester County (3 seats)
 Yates County (1 seat)

Note: There are now 62 counties in the State of New York. The counties which are not mentioned in this list had not yet been established, or sufficiently organized, the area being included in one or more of the abovementioned counties.

Assemblymen
The asterisk (*) denotes members of the previous Legislature who continued as members of this Legislature.

The party affiliations follow the vote for U.S. Senator and state treasurer.

Employees
 Clerk: Francis Seger
 Sergeant-at-Arms: Pomeroy Jones
 Doorkeeper: Alonzo Crosby
 Assistant Doorkeeper: Oliver Scovil

Notes

Sources
 The New York Civil List compiled by Franklin Benjamin Hough (Weed, Parsons and Co., 1858) [pg. 109 and 441 for Senate districts; pg. 128f for senators; pg. 148f for Assembly districts; pg. 210f for assemblymen]
 The History of Political Parties in the State of New-York, from the Ratification of the Federal Constitution to 1840 by Jabez D. Hammond (4th ed., Vol. 2, Phinney & Co., Buffalo, 1850; pg. 336 to 368)

054
1831 in New York (state)
1831 U.S. legislative sessions